"Subsoil" is a short story by American writer Nicholson Baker, which first appeared in The New Yorker periodical on June 27, 1994.  

The story is about a man who meets his doom after being assaulted and forced by attacking, sprouting potatoes that lure agriculturalists into their sleepy Krebs Cycle.

Plot summary
Nyle T. Milner, a hard-working agricultural historian, is busy researching and working on a book about the early harrow. He is in the process of traveling to the Museum of the Tractor located in Harvey, New York for the fourth time. He asks Bill Fipton for recommendations of accommodations, and Bill offers up "The Taits" inn stating that they make an "interesting" soup. He explores the hotel room and comes across a Mr. Potato Head Kit. He opens the box quickly and is surprised to find a real potato with all the facial features still punctured into it. The mummified potato startles him.

Following his encounter with the potato, Nyle makes his way down from his room for dinner. He learns that the menu was leek and potato soup; however, he is the only one eating it. After some time, he mentions the Mr. Potato Head Kit he had found earlier and states how it had startled him. After dinner, Mrs. Tait leads Nyle into the kitchen, revealing to him dozens of potatoes all shapes and sizes and making sure to mention that they only use "fresh" ones. Nyle leaves the Taits and proceeds to his room. While trying to fall asleep he wondered why Mrs. Tait used the word "fresh".

He wakes up to venture back downstairs to the kitchen, though when he gets to the door he notices a sprout coming through the keyhole. He opens the door and notices a dozen or more potatoes coming toward him. Nyle goes back inside and tries to blockade the door. The potatoes are coming after him. Nyle tries to escape; however, the dead Mr. Potato Head's spuds spawn veer toward Nyle's face, causing him to fall. The potatoes begin to inhabit his body planting themselves within. After some time Nyle wakes up in a very dark place - the box he originally encountered upon his arrival at "The Taits". A child begins pushing the Mr. Potato Head features into Nyle and puts him back into the box. Many years later, a man opens the box and is frightened by the mummified potato which ultimately begins the new Krebs Cycle.

References

Sources

American short stories
Gothic short stories
Works originally published in The New Yorker
1994 short stories